
Gmina Nieborów is a rural gmina (administrative district) in Łowicz County, Łódź Voivodeship, in central Poland.

The gmina contains part of the protected area called Bolimów Landscape Park.

Villages
Gmina Nieborów contains the villages and settlements of Arkadia, Bednary-Kolonia, Bednary-Wieś, Bełchów, Bobrowniki, Chyleniec, Dzierzgów, Dzierzgówek, Janowice, Julianów, Karolew, Kompina, Michałówek, Mysłaków, Nieborów, Patoki, Piaski, Sypień and Zygmuntów.

Neighbouring gminas
Gmina Nieborów is bordered by the town of Łowicz and by the gminas of Bolimów, Kocierzew Południowy, Łowicz, Łyszkowice, Nowa Sucha and Skierniewice.

References
 Polish official population figures 2006

Nieborow
Łowicz County